Battle of the Atlantic: The Ocean Lifeline is a 1984 video game published by Simulations Canada.

Gameplay
Battle of the Atlantic is a game in which the Battle of the Atlantic is simulated.

Reception
William H. Harrington reviewed the game for Computer Gaming World, and stated that "a sophisticated and highly playable simulation of this decisive World War II naval conflict."

References

External links

Review in InCider

1984 video games
Apple II games
Atari ST games
Computer wargames
Naval video games
Simulations Canada video games
Turn-based strategy video games
Video games about Nazi Germany
Video games developed in Canada
World War II video games